U.F.O. (re-titled Alien Uprising in 2013) is a 2012 British science fiction film about an alien invasion, written and directed by independent British filmmaker Dominic Burns.  It stars Bianca Bree, Sean Brosnan and Simon Phillips. U.F.O. was filmed in Crabtree Close, Allestree, Derby.

Plot

A military team sent to a house at midnight find a bloody scene and receive the kill-order. Gunshots ring out, and a young woman stumbles out of the house.

Two days earlier, Dana leaves a club her fiancé Robin and their friends: SAS lieutenant Michael, Vincent, and new girl Carrie. Back at Robin's house Michael and Carrie have sex while Dana and Robin celebrate their engagement. They drunkenly stumble from the house and are warned by a tramp of danger from people with a purple mark. When a city-sized spaceship hovers over Derby, society begins to break down. Their friend Pete lets them gather supplies at the closed store where he works while Michael frightens off other looters with a pistol, and they return to Robin's house.

Michael and Carrie go to get fuel and ammunition. A gas station attendant says there will be war because even if the aliens don't attack first, human governments will panic and attack the aliens. Michael and Carrie have a car accident and Michael administers a mercy killing to a fatally wounded survivor. They rescue an injured girl and try to get her medical supplies but are stopped by a policeman, who lets them pass when the girl identifies him as a "man with a purple mark". The policeman suddenly attacks the girl. Michael and Carrie kill the policeman.

Aliens target Robin's house. Robin and Vincent go out to steal a car, and Dana is stalked by a spotter ship. Soldiers Kenny and Sam bring the ship down with a rocket launcher. Reunited, the group are heading for George's house when the tramp confronts them with a pistol, saying that they are protecting the Devil. The tramp kills Robin and the soldiers shoot him dead. At George's house they are convinced that aliens are hiding among humans, identifiable via a purple mark. George reveals that he has been monitoring the situation with an alien transmitter and they should only trust people they know. None of them can vouch for Carrie, so Michael says he will privately inspect her. As they enter a room Carrie shoots him dead then fights off Sam, Kenny, and George, and survives a point blank shot from George's shotgun. She escapes with Dana hostage, and Kenny shoots her just as she teleports to a spaceship. George offers the aliens technology but they disintegrate him.

Kenny and Sam's automatic rifles are having no effect on the UFO, when another UFO destroys it. The sky fills with two different kinds of UFO attacking each other. Sam is killed in the crossfire as the others retreat to George's house. A televised newsreader in Carrie's form announces that humanity has won the war and people should return to their homes. Vincent attempts to rape Dana, and Kenny beats him and threatens to kill him. An alien infiltration team led by a duplicate of the policeman breaks in and reports that a young girl there can identify them. Flashbacks reveal that several copies of him had followed the group. The team receives a go-ahead to kill everyone in the house, and their screams are heard over the radio. In the depths of outer space, the battle between the two alien factions rages on, as the mothership begins to descend.

Cast 

 Bianca Bree as Carrie/TV Announcer
 Sean Brosnan as Michael Galloway
 Jean-Claude van Damme as George
 Simon Phillips as Robin
 Maya Grant as Dana
 Jazz Lintott as Vincent
 Andrew Shim as Sam
 Peter Barrett as Kenny
 Julian Glover as John
 Sean Pertwee as Tramp
 Joey Ansah as Police Officer / Black Ops Soldier
 Dominic Burns as Pete
 Andy Fenn as hungry fat guy
 Jason Bee as boy who gets pushed

Release 
Under the title UFO, the film premiered at the Prince Charles Theatre, Leicester Square, London on 13 December 2012, and went into general release on 24 December. In June 2013, the film was re-titled Alien Uprising and re-released in cinemas, as well as on video-on-demand services.  It was released on home video 17 December 2013.

Reception 
Neil Smith of Total Film rated the film 2/5 stars and wrote, "Alas, no amount of fiscal ingenuity can excuse the wooden acting and crummy dialogue in what is a feeble offering."  Paul Mount of Starburst rated the film 3/10 and wrote, "UFO is a misfire which has neither the coherent script nor the budget to even begin to make it work."

References

External links 
 
 
 

2012 films
2012 science fiction action films
2010s science fiction war films
British independent films
British science fiction action films
British disaster films
2010s English-language films
Alien invasions in films
Apocalyptic films
British science fiction war films
Films set in England
Films shot in England
Films directed by Dominic Burns
2010s British films